Anolis wellbornae is a species of lizard in the family Dactyloidae. The species is found in Nicaragua, El Salvador, Honduras, and Guatemala.

References

Anoles
Reptiles described in 1940
Reptiles of Nicaragua
Reptiles of El Salvador
Reptiles of Honduras
Reptiles of Guatemala
Taxa named by Ernst Ahl